The Angeles Crest 100-Mile Endurance Run, or AC100, is an ultramarathon 100 miles (162 kilometers) long that takes place annually along trails through California's Angeles National Forest.

The course was originally designed to be a challenging 30-hour course, but due to its difficulty, the official cut-off time is set to 33 hours.

The race is limited to 150 participants; registrants must qualify by completing at least a 50-mile run in the previous year.

The Course 
The race starts in Wrightwood, following portions of the Pacific Crest Trail (where it climbs Mount Baden-Powell), the Silver Moccasin Trail, and the Gabrielino Trail. It finishes at Loma Alta Park in Altadena, CA, near NASA's Jet Propulsion Laboratory.

History
The first event was held in 1986, and was mapped out by Del Beaudoin. Since then, the course has remained mostly consistent. The original finish line was the Rose Bowl in Pasadena through 1991. In 1992 the finish line was shifted to Johnson's Field in the Arroyo, adjacent to the Arroyo Seco. In 2008 the finish line was moved to Loma Alta Park, in Altadena.

Since the early 2000s the course has been extended an extra 1 mile around Cooper Canyon due to a closure enforced by the Forest Service to save the endangered Yellow-Legged Tree Frog.

The race was held in September until 2010, when the date as moved up August (except for 2011 and 2012, when it was held in July).

After the Station Fire cancelled the 2009 race, the race dates were changed in order to avoid the fire season.

When Jim O'Brien set the course record in 1989, the overall course was about 1 mile longer.

Awards 
Runners who cross the finish line in less than 24 hours receive the Silver Belt Buckle. A solid sterling silver belt buckle, only 15 to 20 percent of participants earn this award each 

All runners finishing between 24 and 25:05 hours receive the Second Sunrise Ram Buckle, made of solid bronze. Any runner who completes the race between 25:47 and 33 hours is awarded with the 33 Hour Ram Buckle. Additionally, all finishers regardless of finishing time get an engraved metal plate mounted on a solid walnut plaque and a finisher T-shirt.

Course Records 
Jim O'Brien, until 2013 coach of Arcadia Boys' Cross Country team (ranked #1 in the U.S. and 2-time National Champions), has held the men's course record since 1989 with a finish time of 17:35:48. Pam Smith holds the women's course record with her time of 21:04:18, which she achieved in 2014.

Western Slam 
This race is also one of the four  endurance runs in the United States that comprise the "Western Slam," a feat entailing the completion of these four notoriously tough  events:  
 Leadville 100 in Colorado
 Western States 100 in Northern California
 Wasatch 100 in Utah
 Angeles Crest 100 in Southern California

References

External links
Angeles Crest 100 Homepage
RealEndurance AC100 race page

Ultramarathons in California
San Gabriel Mountains